Bicyclus procora, the cinnamon bush brown, is a butterfly in the family Nymphalidae. It is found in Guinea, Sierra Leone, Liberia, Ivory Coast, Ghana, Togo, Nigeria, Cameroon, the Democratic Republic of the Congo and Uganda. The habitat consists of deep forests of good quality.

References

Elymniini
Butterflies described in 1893
Butterflies of Africa